Molly Ann Fichtner (born June 18, 1992) is an American softball coach and former player. She is currently the head coach at Louisiana–Monroe.

Career
She attended Clear Brook High School in Houston, Texas. She later attended the University of Texas at San Antonio for two years, before transferring to the University of Alabama, where she played catcher for the Alabama Crimson Tide softball team. Fichtner was diagnosed with type 1 diabetes at age 12, and played four years of NCAA Division I college softball with the condition. During her senior season in 2014, Fichtner led the Crimson Tide to the 2014 Women's College World Series finals, where they fell to Florida, 2–0.

Coaching career
After graduating from Alabama, Fichtner later went on to serve as an assistant softball coach at the University of Alabama, Dartmouth College, and East Carolina University. 

On September 21, 2018, Fichtner was named head softball coach at Louisiana–Monroe.

Head coaching record

References

External links
 
 Louisiana–Monroe Warhawks bio
 Alabama Crimson Tide bio
 UTSA Roadrunners bio
 East Carolina Pirates bio
 Dartmouth Big Green bio

1992 births
Living people
Female sports coaches
American softball coaches
Alabama Crimson Tide softball coaches
Alabama Crimson Tide softball players
Dartmouth Big Green softball coaches
East Carolina Pirates softball coaches
Louisiana–Monroe Warhawks softball coaches
UTSA Roadrunners softball players
People with type 1 diabetes
Sportspeople from Houston